Dinton Quarry is a 3,000 square metre geological Site of Special Scientific Interest in Wiltshire, notified in 1990. This long-disused quarry of Middle Purbeck limestone was the main source of the late Jurassic fossil insects described by Brodie in 1845.

Sources
 Natural England citation sheet for the site  (accessed 24 March 2022)

External links
 Natural England (SSSI information)

Sites of Special Scientific Interest in Wiltshire
Sites of Special Scientific Interest notified in 1990
Quarries in Wiltshire